Production budget is a term used specifically in film production and, more generally, in business.

A "film production budget" determines how much will be spent on the entire film project. 
This involves identifying the elements and then estimating their cost, for each phase of filmmaking (development, pre-production, production, post-production and distribution). 
The budget structure normally separates "above-the-line" (creative) and "below-the-line" (technical) costs.

In business, "production budget" refers to the budget set by a corporation for the number of units of a product that will be required and produced;
 

See also 
Film budgeting
Television crew
Budget

References

Sources 
 Film Budgeting by Ralph S. Singleton (1996)
 Film Production Management by Bastian Clevé (2nd ed, 2000)
 The Complete Film Production Handbook (3rd ed, 2001)
 The On Production Budget Book by Robert J. Koster (1997)
 Production Management for TV and Film. The Professional's Guide by Linda Stradling 2010 (Methuen)

Film and video terminology
Television terminology
Budgets
Management accounting